Khuda Gawah (also translated and released as God Is My Witness) is a 1992 Indian epic drama film written and directed by Mukul S. Anand. It stars Amitabh Bachchan,  Nagarjuna, Sridevi, Shilpa Shirodkar, Danny Denzongpa, Kiran Kumar in pivotal roles. The music was composed by Laxmikant–Pyarelal. The film marked Sridevi and Bachchan's third collaboration. In the film, Badshah Khan travels from Afghanistan to India to find the killer of Benazir's father so that he can impress her. He succeeds but soon finds himself framed for a murder and trapped in an Indian prison.

Khuda Gawah was released theatrically on May 8, 1992, to critical and commercial success. It was praised for its direction, screenplay, performances, soundtrack, and production values, and grossed 17.05 crore worldwide, becoming the third highest grossing Indian film of 1992. It entered Limca Book of Records as the first Indian film to use surround sound technique. The film was dubbed in Telugu and was later adapted into a Pakistani television series of the same name. It is one of the most watched Indian films in Afghanistan's history.

At the 38th Filmfare Awards, Khuda Gawah received a leading 9 nominations, including Best Film, Best Actor (Bachchan), Best Actress (Sridevi) and Best Supporting Actress (Shirodkar) and won 4 awards including Best Director (Anand) and Best Supporting Actor (Denzongpa) and Best Action.

Plot

During a Buzkashi competition with a neighbouring tribe in Afghanistan, Badshah Khan falls in love with Benazir and wants to marry her. Benazir agrees to marry him, on the condition that he must bring her the head of Habibullah, who killed her father. Badshah Khan goes to India to search for Habibullah. He finds Habibullah in a prison and breaks him out to take him back. He has the jailor Ranveer Singh on his trail. He chops off Habibullah's head. When confronted by Ranveer, he tells him that he would be back in a month to receive punishment for taking Habibullah. Badshah goes back to Afghanistan and marries Benazir; after the time limit, he comes back to India and surrenders himself to Ranveer Singh, who he addresses as "Rajput Khan" and is jailed for five years. While Badshah Khan is away, his childhood friend Khuda Baksh assumes the role of a guardian for Benazir.

To revenge Habibullah's death, his brother Pasha kidnaps Heena, the daughter of jailor Ranveer, ransoming her in return for Badshah. Badshah finds out about this and escapes from jail; he confronts Pasha, only to have Inspector Aziz Mirza kill Ranveer Singh. With Ranveer Singh's daughter as a pawn in Pasha's hands, Badshah admits to killing Ranveer Singh and is sentenced to 15 years. When Aziz's wife Salma, who thinks of Badshah as her brother, visits Badshah and ends up killing her husband to protect Badshah, but Badshah takes the blame for that murder as well, since he believes that her son Raja needs her.

At that time, Benazir sends Khuda Baksh to check on Badshah. Due to his very extended stay in prison, Badshah makes Khuda Baksh promise to take care of his daughter Mehndi and tell his wife Benazir that he is now dead so that she can move on rather than wait for him. Benazir goes mad when she hears the news that her husband is dead.

On coming out of prison, Badshah meets with his now grown daughter, Mehndi, who has found out that her father is still alive and has come to India to look for her father; the daughter of Ranveer Singh, Heena, who is also in the police force and knows all about Badshah's past and respects him as her uncle; and the son of Inspector Aziz Mirza, Inspector Raja Mirza, who has found out that it was Badshah who had killed his father and is out for vengeance. In a twist of fate, Raja is in love with Mehndi, even though he wants to kill her father.

Pasha, now a major crime lord, gets involved. Benazir and Khuda Baksh are kidnapped by him. The truth is eventually revealed to Raja about his father, and he joins of hands with Badshah and Heena to kill their mutual enemy. Badshah and Benazir grab one arm each of Pasha as they ride on separate horses like the beginning of the film and throw him into a huge rock, killing him. They ride off into the sunset, finally together.

Cast

 Amitabh Bachchan as Badshah Khan
 Nagarjuna as Inspector Raja Mirza
 Sridevi as Benazir / Mehndi (Double Role)
 Shilpa Shirodkar as Inspector Heena
 Danny Denzongpa as Khudabaksh
 Kiran Kumar as Pasha
 Bharat Kapoor as Aziz Mirza
 Anjana Mumtaz as Salma Mirza
 Vikram Gokhale as Ranveer Singh
Beena Banerjee as Ranveer Singh's Wife
Surendra Pal as Humayan , Benazir Bodyguard 
Shammi  as KhudaBaksh's Mother

Filming
Khuda Gawah had lavish production values and was extensively shot in and around the cities of Kabul and Mazar-i-Sharif in Afghanistan as well as Nepal and India. Then-Afghan President Mohammad Najibullah, a fan of Bachchan, provided security from the Afghan Air Force during the 18-day shooting of the film in 1991.

Sanjay Dutt was initially cast in the film, and filmed some scenes, but due to his highly published legal issues, he was unable to complete the film.

Soundtrack

The music is composed by Laxmikant–Pyarelal. Lyrics are penned by Anand Bakshi.

Reception
The film was the third-highest-grossing Indian film of 1992. The film received critical acclaim for all its actors and especially the lead pair Sridevi and Amitabh Bachchan. Both stars won Filmfare nominations for their work. With Khuda Gawah, Sridevi became the only actress in the history of Indian cinema to play a double role opposite Amitabh Bachchan till date. The film won three Filmfare awards, including Best Director. It entered India's Limca Book of Records as the first Bollywood film to use surround sound technique. BBC reported that "It ran to packed houses for 10 weeks in Kabul". Khuda Gawah still remains popular in Afghanistan. Rediff reported that the film is "in great demand in the country" when cinemas reopened in 2001.

Awards
38th Filmfare Awards:

Won
Best Director – Mukul S. Anand
Best Supporting Actor – Danny Denzongpa
Best Sound – Bhagat Singh Rathod & Kuldeep Sood

Nominated
Best Film – Nazir Ahmed & Manoj Desai
Best Actor – Amitabh Bachchan
Best Actress – Sridevi
Best Supporting Actress – Shilpa Shirodkar
Best Villain – Kiran Kumar
Best Female Playback Singer – Kavita Krishnamurthy for "Main Tujhe Kabool"

References

External links
 

1990s Hindi-language films
Filmfare Awards winners
1992 films
Films set in Afghanistan
Films shot in Afghanistan
Films shot in Bhutan
Films shot in Nepal
Films shot in Kathmandu
Films shot in Mumbai
Films shot in Rajasthan
Films directed by Mukul S. Anand
Films scored by Laxmikant–Pyarelal
Indian historical action films
Indian epic films
Indian drama films